Edmund Patrick Radwan (September 22, 1911 –  September 7, 1959) was an American politician from New York.

Life
He was born on September 22, 1911, in Buffalo, New York, of Polish descent. He attended the public schools, and graduated from University of Buffalo Law School in 1934. Radwan was an athletics coach at East High School in Buffalo from 1929 to 1934.

He was admitted to the bar in 1935, and practiced law in Buffalo. He was Attorney of the Village of Sloan from 1938 to 1940. During World War II he served as a corporal in the United States Army from 1943 to 1945.

Radwan was a member of the New York State Senate (54th D.) from 1946 to 1950, sitting in the 165th, 166th and 167th New York State Legislatures.

He was elected as a Republican to the 82nd, 83rd, 84th and 85th United States Congresses, holding office from January 3, 1951, to January 3, 1959. Radwan voted in favor of the Civil Rights Act of 1957.

He died on September 7, 1959, in Buffalo, New York; and was buried at the St. Stanislaus Cemetery there.

References

External links

1911 births
1959 deaths
University at Buffalo Law School alumni
Republican Party New York (state) state senators
Politicians from Buffalo, New York
American politicians of Polish descent
Republican Party members of the United States House of Representatives from New York (state)
20th-century American politicians
United States Army personnel of World War II
United States Army non-commissioned officers